PDM was a Dutch professional cycling team from 1986 until the end of 1992. Gin-MG was co-sponsor in Spanish races and Cidona was co-sponsor in the 1991 Nissan Classic. The team was sponsored by Philips Dupont Magnetics, a joint venture between the electronics company, Philips, and the chemical company, DuPont. The team rode Concorde bicycles, manufactured in Italy, by several builders that were colour coordinated to the team jersey by Ultima.

History
Roy Schuiten was team manager and Jan Gisbers directeur sportif in 1986. Gisbers took over as the team manager the following year and remained until 1992. He was joined by Piet van der Kruijs and Ferdi van den Haute. The team was owned by Manfred Krikke, of Veltec Rentmeester.

The team was successful in classics and had a rider second overall in the Tour de France in 1987 with Pedro Delgado and 1988 with Steven Rooks. It also had third place with Erik Breukink in 1990. It won the Tour team classification in 1988 and 1989. PDM rider Gert-Jan Theunisse was second in the 1988 Tour de France, battling former PDM teammate Pedro Delgado, when he tested positive for testosterone and received a 10-minute penalty.

The team dropped out of the 1991 Tour de France with reported food poisoning. Team members and team doctor Wim Sanders said in a TV documentary in 2008 that the cause was careless storage of Intralipid, a nutritional aid with which riders had been injected. The team continued one more year, after which the sponsor sold the team to Festina.

Doping affair
In November 1997 Cyclingnews.com reported an inquiry in The Netherlands, which appeared to reveal doping in the PDM team. Wim Sanders, the doctor from 1990 to 1991, was  the centre of the investigation, which was initiated when the general manager of the team, Manfred Krikke, called the Fiscal Information and Investigation Service to investigate. It was said Sanders supplied anabolic steroids and EPO to the team and was responsible for the intralipid affair of the 1991 Tour de France. According to Cyclingnews.com, 1990 was the height of the drug taking in the team and  two riders stopped with heart problems; whether this refers to stopping professional cycling or performance-enhancing drugs was unclear. Gisbers denied knowledge of doping.

Major results

1986
 Overall Vuelta a Andalucía, Steven Rooks
Prologue, Steven Rooks
Stage 2, Wim Arras
Amstel Gold Race, Steven Rooks
GP de Wallonie, Steven Rooks
Stage 2 Tour de Suisse, Gerrie Knetemann
Stage 12 Tour de France, Pedro Delgado
Profronde van Oostvoorne, Gerrie Knetemann
Stage 2a Volta a Catalunya, Wim Arras
Memorial Fred de Bruyne, Wim Arras
Munte Cyclo-cross, Hennie Stamsnijder
Oss Cyclo-cross, Hennie Stamsnijder
Overijse Cyclo-cross, Hennie Stamsnijder
Loenhout Cyclo-cross, Hennie Stamsnijder

1987
 National Cyclo-cross Championship, Hennie Stamsnijder
Overall Superprestige Cyclo-cross, Hennie Stamsnijder
Zillebeke Cyclo-cross, Hennie Stamsnijder
Ronde van Limburg, Wim Arras
 Sprint classification Setmana Catalana de Ciclismo, Hans Daams
Stages 1b & 3, Wim Arras
Galder Criterium, Adri van der Poel
Made Criterium, Wim Arras
Stage 2 Tour de Suisse, Steven Rooks
Humbeek Road Race, Marc Dierickx
 National Road Race Championship, Adri van der Poel
 National Road Race Championship, Jörg Müller
Stage 9 Tour de France, Adri van der Poel
Stage 19 Tour de France, Pedro Delgado
Boxmeer Criterium, Adri van der Poel
Profronde van Stiphout, Pedro Delgado
Noordwijk aan Zee Derny, Adri van der Poel
GP du canton d'Argovie, Adri van der Poel
Heusden Individueel, Henri Manders
Profronde van Maastricht, Wim Arras
Dongen Criterium, Peter Stevenhaagen
Anderlues Criterium, Gerrie Knetemann
Wetteren Derny, Peter Hoondert
GP de Fourmies, Adri van der Poel
Stage 6 Volta a Catalunya, Jörg Müller
Paris–Brussels, Wim Arras
Paris–Tours, Adri van der Poel
Giro del Piemonte, Adri van der Poel
Oss Cyclo-cross, Hennie Stamsnijder
Valkenswaard Cyclo-cross, Hennie Stamsnijder
Loenhout Cyclo-cross, Hennie Stamsnijder

1988
 National Cyclo-cross Championship, Hennie Stamsnijder
Overijse Cyclo-cross, Hennie Stamsnijder
Stage 5 Vuelta a Andalucía, Adri van der Poel
 Overall Étoile de Bessèges, Adri van der Poel
Liège–Bastogne–Liège, Adri van der Poel
Apeldoorn Criterium, Steven Rooks
 Mountains classification Tour de France, Steven Rooks
Stage 12, Steven Rooks
Stage 16, Adri van der Poel
Boxmeer Criterium, Gert-Jan Theunisse
Draai van de Kaai, Steven Rooks
Mijl van Mares, Adri van der Poel
Stage 1 Deurne, Steven Rooks
Clásica de San Sebastián, Gert-Jan Theunisse
Regenboogkoers, Gert-Jan Theunisse
Kampioenschap van Zürich, Steven Rooks
Trio Normand, Vincent Barteau
Saint-Pierre Criterium, Adri van der Poel
Oss Cyclo-cross, Hennie Stamsnijder

1989
Overall Superprestige Cyclo-cross, Hennie Stamsnijder
Zillebeke Cyclo-cross, Hennie Stamsnijder
Stage 1 Vuelta a Murcia, Johannes Draaijer
 Overall Tour du Vaucluse, Steven Rooks
Liège–Bastogne–Liège, Sean Kelly
Tom Simpson Memorial Grand Prix, Martin Earley
Stage 4 Tour de Trump, Gert-Jan Theunisse
 Overall Vuelta a Asturias, Gert-Jan Theunisse
Points classification, Gert-Jan Theunisse
Stage 6a, Gert-Jan Theunisse
Stage 6b, John Vos
Hansweert Criterium, Peter Hoondert
 Points classification Tour de France, Sean Kelly
 Mountains classification, Gert-Jan Theunisse
Teams classification
Stage 3, Raúl Alcalá
Stage 8, Martin Earley
Stage 15, Steven Rooks
Stage 17, Gert-Jan Theunisse
Ronse, Sean Kelly
Wateringen, Marc Van Orsouw
Maarheeze, Steven Rooks
Montréal, Jörg Müller
Stage 2b (TTT) Volta a Catalunya
Mountains classification Tour of Ireland, Sean Kelly
Teams classification 
UCI Road World Cup, Sean Kelly

1990
Stage 5 Étoile de Bessèges, John Van Den Akker
 Combination classification Volta a la Comunitat Valenciana, John Vos
Stage 4, Uwe Raab
Stage 5 Vuelta a Murcia, John Van Den Akker
Grote Prijs Berloz, Uwe Raab
Sprint classification Vuelta a España, Uwe Raab
Stage 8, Atle Pedersen
Stages 10, 16 & 22, Uwe Raab
Bavel Criterium, Jos Van Aert
Purnode Criterium, Dirk De Wolf
 Overall Tour de Suisse, Sean Kelly
Stage 4, Sean Kelly
Stage 5, Erik Breukink
Stage 10, Uwe Ampler
Stage 7 Tour de France, Raúl Alcalá
Mosselkoers–Houtem–Vilvoorde Ind., Nico Verhoeven
Stages 12 & 20 Tour de France, Erik Breukink
Profronde van Wateringen, Erik Breukink
Draai van de Kaai, Erik Breukink
 UCI Road World Championships, Rudy Dhaenens
Tongeren Criterium, Rudy Dhaenens
Stage 7a Volta a Catalunya, Erik Breukink
Grand Prix de la Libération (TTT)
Aalsmeer Criterium, Gert Jakobs
Beernem Criterium, Rudy Dhaenens
 Overall Tour of Ireland, Erik Breukink
Stage 2a, Erik Breukink
Oostrozebeke Criterium, Rudy Dhaenens
Grand Prix de Lunel, Erik Breukink
Stages 1 & 2 Vuelta y Ruta de Mexico, Nico Verhoeven

1991
Stage 5 Paris–Nice, Jean-Paul van Poppel
Stages 3, 5a & 6 Vuelta a Aragón, Jean-Paul van Poppel
Stage 5b Vuelta a Aragón, Uwe Raab
Stage 5 Vuelta a España, Uwe Raab
 Points classification Vuelta a España, Uwe Raab
Stages 6, 9, 13 & 21, Jean-Paul van Poppel
 Overall Tour DuPont, Erik Breukink
Prolgoue & Stage 11, Erik Breukink 
Stage 1 Critérium du Dauphiné, John Talen
Stage 1a Vuelta a los Valles Mineros, John Talen
Stage 4 Vuelta a los Valles Mineros, Harald Maier
 National Road Race Championship, Falk Boden
Stage 7 Tour de France, Jean-Paul van Poppel
Profronde van Stiphout, Erik Breukink
Mijl van Mares, Nico Verhoeven
Giro di Lombardia, Sean Kelly
Lieshout Cyclo-cross, Martin Hendriks
Loenhout Cyclo-cross, Nico Verhoeven

1992
Stage 8 Tour Méditerranéen, Jean-Paul van Poppel
Omloop der Vlaamse Ardennen, Nico Verhoeven
Stage 1 Vuelta a Murcia, Jean-Paul van Poppel
Stage 3 Vuelta a Murcia, Nico Verhoeven
Stage 5 Vuelta a Aragón, Danny Nelissen
Stages 3 & 5 Vuelta a España, Jean-Paul van Poppel
Stage 7 Vuelta a España, Erik Breukink
Stage 16 Vuelta a España, Tom Cordes
GP de Wallonie, Danny Nelissen
Ronde van Limburg, Jans Koerts
Stage 1a Vuelta a los Valles Mineros, Uwe Raab
Kelmis–Ostbelgien-rundfahrt, Nico Verhoeven
Stage 10 Tour de France, Jean-Paul van Poppel
Profronde van Wateringen, Erik Breukink
Clásica de San Sebastián, Raúl Alcalá
Profronde van Surhuisterveen, Gert Jakobs
Melsele Road Race, John Talen
Giro del Piemonte, Erik Breukink

Team riders

References

Defunct cycling teams based in the Netherlands
Cycling teams based in the Netherlands
Cycling teams established in 1986
Cycling teams disestablished in 1992